andHow.FM is a non-profit, independent radio station which broadcasts at 107.5 FM in Mangaroa, New Zealand.  The station broadcasts 24 hours a day from their FM broadcast and internet radio simulcast. andHow.FM is licensed with APRA and Recorded Music NZ in New Zealand for music broadcasting rights and operates under the NZ laws governing LPFM transmission. The station openly encourages and programs music from primarily independent music artists.

History
andHow.FM commenced broadcasting on their FM signal 21 January 2009, from Papakowhai and previously at its internet radio presence AndHow Web Radio since 8 November 1998.  The station is solely funded by andHow Limited, in addition to donations & contributions from the listening public.  On 22 June 2018 the station relocated its studios and broadcast tower to Mangaroa Valley, Upper Hutt.

Format

The andHow.FM regular programming consists of a mix of music from the indie rock, alternative rock, modern rock & vintage rock genres.  There are also a varied format of live shows throughout the week from volunteer presenters with interests in everything from 40s & 50s rhythm & blues, modern classical, ambient music, contemporary jazz, Americana to cutting edge electronica, that reflect a wide spectrum of music tastes.

References

External links
 

1998 in radio
Radio stations established in 1998
Radio stations in Wellington
Rock radio stations
Mass media companies established in 1998